Vakulabharanam (pronounced ) is a rāgam in Carnatic music (musical scale of South Indian classical music). It is the 14th melakarta rāgam in the 72 melakarta rāgam system of Carnatic music. It is called Dhātivasantabhairavi or Vātivasantabhairavi in Muthuswami Dikshitar school of Carnatic music. In Western Music, it is E major.

Structure and Lakshana

It is the 2nd rāgam in the 3rd chakra Agni. The mnemonic name is Agni-Sri. The mnemonic phrase is sa ra gu ma pa dha ni. Its  structure (ascending and descending scale) is as follows (see swaras in Carnatic music for details on below notation and terms):
: 
: 

Shuddha rishabham, antara gandharam, shuddha madhyamam, shuddha dhaivatham and kaisiki nishadham are the swaras used in this scale. As this scale is a melakarta rāgam, by definition it is a sampoorna rāgam (has all seven notes in ascending and descending scale).

Asampurna Melakarta 
Vātivasantabhairavi is the 14th Melakarta in the original list compiled by Venkatamakhin. The notes used in the scale are the same, but the descending scale has notes used in zig-zag manner (vakra prayoga).
: 
:

Janya rāgams 
Vakulabharanam has a few minor janya rāgams (derived scales) associated with it, of which Vasantabhairavi is heard occasionally in concerts. See List of janya rāgams for full list of rāgams associated with Vakulabharanam.

Compositions
Here are a few common compositions sung in concerts, set to Vakulabharanam.
Gowrinatham by Oottukkadu Venkata Kavi
Ye ramuni nammitino by Thyagaraja
Nambinen ayya by Koteeswara Iyer
Rama namamai by Mysore Vasudevachar
KumĀruni valenu kĀvavĒ by Dr. M. Balamuralikrishna
Saadhu tada, a composition by Maharaja Swati Tirunal of Travancore, tuned by Prince Rama Varma.
Paripaahimaam siddhivinayaka by Mysuru Maharaja Jayachamarajendra Wodeyar

Film Songs

Language:Tamil

Language:Hindi

Janya:Surya/Srothoswini Ragam 
Ascending: S G3 M1 D1 N2 S

Descending:S N2 D1 M1 G3 S

Film Songs:Tamil

Related rāgams
This section covers the theoretical and scientific aspect of this rāgam.

Vakulabharanam's notes when shifted using Graha bhedam, yields 2 major melakarta rāgams, namely Keeravani and Hemavati along with 1 minor melakarta rāgam Kosalam. For further details and an illustration refer Graha bhedam on Keeravani.

Vakulabharanam corresponds to Phrygian dominant scale in Western music.

Notes

References

Melakarta ragas